Duane Clair Bickett (born December 1, 1962) is a former American football outside linebacker in the National Football League (NFL). He played for the Indianapolis Colts, the Seattle Seahawks, and the Carolina Panthers.
Duane is currently an assistant defensive coach at Torrey Pines High School in San Diego, CA.

High school career
Bickett prepped at Glendale High School.

College career
Bickett played college football at the University of Southern California.

Professional career
He played professionally in the National Football League for the Indianapolis Colts, Seattle Seahawks, and the Carolina Panthers. In 1985 Bickett was chosen as the NFL Defensive Rookie of the Year.  He was a Pro Bowler in 1987.

NFL statistics

References

1962 births
Living people
Players of American football from Los Angeles
American football linebackers
Glendale High School (Glendale, California) alumni
USC Trojans football players
Indianapolis Colts players
Seattle Seahawks players
Carolina Panthers players
National Football League Defensive Rookie of the Year Award winners
American Conference Pro Bowl players